Respect is the third album by singer-songwriter, Diana King. It includes the lead single, "Summer Breezin'" and the songs "Down Lo", "She Had A..." and "Wallflower". "Summer Breezin" was featured in the video game Dead or Alive Xtreme 2.

Track listing

 "Summer Breezin'"
 "Suga, Suga"
 "Credit Card"
 "Mi Lova"
 "Smooth Girl"
 "Down Lo (with Papa Dee)"
 "Tick Boom"
 "She Had A..."
 "Whin Ya Waist"
 "Wallflower"
 "Dance"
 "The Real Sh*t"
 "Summer Breezin'" featuring Bounty Killer

Chart positions

Singles

References 

Diana King albums
2002 albums
Maverick Records albums